The Pinkawillinie Conservation Park is  north of Kimba on the inland side of Eyre Peninsula in South Australia.

The park encompasses 130 000 hectares and abuts the Gawler Ranges National Park to the north west. There is limited 2wd access to the park and no facilities.

The conservation park is categorised as an IUCN Category VI protected area.  In 1980, it was listed on the now-defunct Register of the National Estate.

See also
Protected areas of South Australia
Corrobinnie Hill Conservation Park

References

External links
Entry for Pinkawillinie Conservation Park on Protected Planet 

Conservation parks of South Australia
Protected areas established in 1970
1970 establishments in Australia
Eyre Peninsula
South Australian places listed on the defunct Register of the National Estate